Sivasagar Tank, also known as Borpukhuri is a large tank in Sivasagar dug by the Ahoms in the 18th century. It is located in the heart of Sivasagar, Assam, India. The tank is located near the Sivasagar Sivadol, a major landmark of the town. The tank is built on an area of 130 acres (52.6 hectares) and is 64 feet (19.5 metres) deep.

History and architecture 
This large tank was built by Queen Ambika, consort of Shiva Singha, in the year 1734. The water level of the tank never changes which highlights the advanced hydrology of the Ahom period. According to historian Mills, the tank was built in one night.

The tank is an architectural masterpiece made hundred of years ago. One cannot visually understand that it was made in the absence of any technological support.

Flora and fauna 
Sivasagar Tank is an important habitat for migratory birds during winter season and it is also a home of many flowering plants. This makes the tank an attractive landscape in the town.

References 

 Sivasagar district
 Buildings and structures in Assam
 Tourism in Assam
Sivasagar
Reservoirs in India
Water Heritage Sites in India